Enchantment is the fourth studio album featuring the voice of 15-year-old soprano Charlotte Church, released in 2001.

Enchantment was Church's final classical studio album with original material. Her next album, Prelude: The Best of Charlotte Church, is a "best of" collection. She subsequently ended her classical genre career and moved on to the pop genre with Tissues and Issues, her final album with Sony Music.

Track listing
"Tonight" (from West Side Story)
"Carrickfergus" (folk)
"Habañera" (Bizet)
"Bali Ha'i" (Rodgers and Hammerstein)
"Papa, Can You Hear Me?" (from Yentl)
"The Flower Duet" (Delibes)
"The Little Horses" (folk)
"From My First Moment" (Gymnopédie No. 1)
"The Water Is Wide" (folk)
"Can't Help Lovin' Dat Man" (from Show Boat)
"The Laughing Song" (from Die Fledermaus)
"If I Loved You" (Rodgers and Hammerstein)
"A Bit of Earth" (from The Secret Garden)
"Somewhere" (from West Side Story)
"The Prayer", with Josh Groban (from Quest for Camelot)
"It's the Heart That Matters Most"

Note: Church covered the "Laughing Song" completely in English.

Charts

Weekly charts

Year-end charts

Release history

Certifications

References

Amazon.com: Enchantment: Music: Charlotte Church
Amazon.co.uk: Enchantment: Music: Charlotte Church

2001 albums
Charlotte Church albums
Columbia Records albums
Classical crossover albums